Hotel St. Benedict Flats is a historic apartment building located at the northeast corner of Chicago Avenue and Wabash Avenue in the Near North Side neighborhood of Chicago, Illinois. Built in 1882, the building was one of the "French flat" luxury apartments constructed after the Great Chicago Fire; named for their resemblance to Parisian apartments, these new buildings brought apartment living to Chicago's upper class. The building was built by Loyola University with the intention to use the revenue to pay for healthcare for the poor. Architect James J. Egan, an Irish Catholic better known for his church designs, designed the Victorian Gothic building. The building's decorative features, such as its lintels, art glass windows, and use of pressed metal, were common features of contemporary upper-class homes, while its mansard roofs evoked French architecture. Egan named the building for the property's previous owners, the Order of Saint Benedict; the "Hotel" portion of the name was added to exploit a legal loophole, as the building never served as a hotel. The original doors still remain on the flats. 

The building was added to the National Register of Historic Places on September 1, 1995.

References

Residential buildings on the National Register of Historic Places in Chicago
Gothic Revival architecture in Illinois
Residential buildings completed in 1882
Apartment buildings in Chicago
Chicago Landmarks